American Hustle (Original Motion Picture Soundtrack) is the soundtrack to the 2013 film American Hustle released by Madison Gate Records and Legacy Recordings on December 6, 2013. The album features a selection of popular music from the 1970s and 1980s performed by Elton John, David Bowie, Frank Sinatra, Paul McCartney and Wings, Bee Gees, Duke Ellington, Jeff Lynne and his Electric Light Orchestra. The album featured mostly classical, rock and jazz selections. An expanded edition of the soundtrack, featuring five more tracks heard in the film was released in two-disc vinyl formats on November 2014. Receiving critical acclaim, the album won a nomination for Best Compilation Soundtrack for Visual Media at the 57th Annual Grammy Awards, and also a nomination for Best Soundtrack at the St. Louis Gateway Film Critics Association Awards 2013.

Development 
According to Russell, the film "was a propulsive kind of cinema that was driven by music" which acted as a key for the two main characters to come together, referencing Duke Ellington's "Jeep Blues"; Russell called it as "very dear to him" and that is about reinvention, adding that "the music helped me get inside the romance. Without the romance, I don't want to tell just the story of these two con artists. Because a lot of their love story—about the dry-cleaning business, and him letting her pick out fur coats from the racks—is true, and that's what is interesting to me." Susan Jacobs, the film's music supervisor, felt that diversity of the music is the key to the film as "it conveys something about the characters" as the music ranges from various genres. Russell added on how Frank Sinatra's "Coffee Song" suited for Carmine Palito (Jeremy Renner) as "It says so much about him. If a director approaches things from the outside, how does the audience get in? These songs allow you to get inside the characters and really know them and understand them. That's why the music I use—like the music in films that I love", referencing to the soundtrack of Goodfellas (1990) and how music depicted their characters.

For the setting of the late 1970s and early 1980s, music emerged in the creative process that brought back Russell to that time period, though the songs he chose does not emerge from that time. In a mob sequence, Russell recalled that Renner had an idea to use Tom Jones' "Delilah" which was "just the perfect song to soundtrack those old-fashioned guys", although he had a conventional taste. In a sequence, where Lawrence grooves to Wings in her living room while wearing cleaning gloves, Russell had no time to do the scene, but he wanted to use the song "Live and Let Die" by Paul McCartney and Wings as "Because when you are dialed into actors you love and music you love, the ideas are visited upon you. When the idea to use the song came to me, people asked, 'Where is that even going to go?' And I said, 'It just feels right to me that her character is going to do this as her declaration of her independence from her husband.' When thoughts like that come to you, it's like they are delivered to you." He also recalled on using "Dirty Work" was "great" as he loved "reclaiming things that aren't considered cool" but was more important that when the song kicks in it is "so specific and affecting".

Promotions 
In celebration of the Record Store Day's "Black Friday" event on November 28, 2014, Madison Gate Records and Legacy Recordings released the expanded edition of the soundtrack in 12-inch two-disc vinyl formats that featured five new tracks in the film, not included in the original release. Collider launched a giveaway contest for its subscribers to email them with their name and address of their contacts, and had liked their page on Facebook, open till December 1. Random winners have received the exclusive vinyl copies of the soundtrack.

Russell headlined the promotions of the album, as he was fan of vinyl discs and said that: "I gave the actors on American Hustle record players and the records that their characters would love. You can get a turntable for $100, and put one in every room. It's just a lovely thing to play vinyl. And there's an experience of opening a vinyl record and holding the art and looking at the sleeve that's unmistakable. I'm really proud of not just the music but the whole package." He further supervised the packaging of vinyl editions, providing hand-written excerpts from the script and a unique imagery from the film.

Track listing

Charts

References 

2013 soundtrack albums
Legacy Recordings soundtracks
Madison Gate Records soundtracks
Classical albums
Rock soundtracks
Jazz soundtracks